Samuel Ferrand Washington (born 1759, fl. 1790 – 1812) was an English merchant and political activist.

Life
He was born in 1759 at Walkeringham, Nottinghamshire, was educated at a German university, and went into commerce. He engaged in the hop trade, and lived near Tonbridge, Kent.

During at least the later part of the American Revolution, he was living in New York City, and joined a Loyalist Militia Regiment, the "Battalion of the Loyal Volunteers of New York. (May 1782)
 
After the American Revolution he lived in Halifax, Nova Scotia, or at least owned property there. (Oct. 1784 - Nov. 1795)

On the outbreak of the French revolution he took up the cause of the republicans, and in 1795 he was chairman of several meetings in London held for the purpose of petitioning the crown and parliament to make peace with France. Because of his views he was expelled from the Surrey troop of light horse. In 1806 he attacked Edmund Burke in a pamphlet entitled Remarks on Mr. Burke's Two Letters "on the Proposals for Peace with the Regicide Directory of France," censuring him for applying the term 'regicide' to the French Directory.

In 1800 he was brought to trial for forestalling hops, having purchased a large number of hop-grounds with a view to controlling the price of their produce. He was found guilty, fined £500, and sentenced to one month's imprisonment. He continued to live in Kent, and in the borough of Southwark, until 1812. The date of his death is uncertain.

Works
 Remarks on Mr. Burke's Two Letters "on the Proposals for Peace with the Regicide Directory of France," London, 1806
 The Metaphysic of Man, a translation from the German of J. C. Goldbeck, London, 1806
 Letter to Thomas Erskine on the Subject of Forestalling Hops, London, 1799 
 An Appeal to British Hop Planters, London, 1805
 The Critical Moment, London, 1805
 Three Letters to that Greatest of Political Apostates George Tierney, London, 1806 
 A Letter to the Lord Mayor on Matters of the highest Importance to a Free People, London, 1810 
 The Oriental Exposition, presenting to the United Kingdom an open Trade to India and China, London, 1811 
 A Key to a Delicate Investigation, London, 1812,  published as "Esculapius". 
 An Address to the People of the United Kingdom, London, 1812, published as Algernon Sydney.

References

Attribution

1759 births
Year of death missing
18th-century English writers
18th-century English male writers
19th-century English writers
19th-century British politicians
English merchants
People from Bassetlaw District